Eleni Stavrou (born 4 July 1975) to Stavros Stavrou and Androulla Xenophontos is a Democratic Rally Member of the Cyprus House of Representatives for Limassol constituency.

She studied English literature at the National and Kapodistrian University of Athens and completed an MA in War and Mediterranean Studies and a PhD in War Studies at King's College London.

References

1975 births
Living people
Alumni of King's College London
Members of the House of Representatives (Cyprus)
Democratic Rally politicians
MEPs for Cyprus 2019–2024